Huevos estrellados or huevos rotos is any of a number of dishes involving eggs fried in a large amount of olive oil or any other oil. In Madrid, huevos estrellados is a dish based on a pan-fried egg with a liquid yolk, accompanied by French fries (some modern versions of this dish use chips), some kind of meat (typically ham, bacon, or a sausage like chorizo or chistorra). The dish is served hot, immediately after plating.

Serving 
Huevos estrellados are typically served with potatoes. The potatoes serve to soak up the yolk of the egg. A variant of the dish known as Duelos y quebrantos involves eggs that are scrambled instead of fried.

Canary Islands cuisine
Egg dishes